Welcome Home, Roxy Carmichael is a 1990 American comedy-drama film directed by Jim Abrahams and starring Winona Ryder and Jeff Daniels.

Plot
Dinky Bossetti is a 15-year-old girl who was adopted as a baby. Dinky is an unkempt goth kid who is constantly picked on at school, although it is not obvious which came first – her antisocial attitude or her being rejected by her adoptive parents and peers. Dinky finds solace in her "Ark", a small cabin-boat beached on a lake shore. In and around the boat, Dinky has collected a menagerie of abandoned animals.

Dinky's adoptive mother Rochelle is disappointed that the daughter she chose has no interest in "feminine" things, such as makeup and nice clothing. Her adoptive father, Les, passively allows his wife to scold Dinky and send her to various "counselors" who are little more than temporary jailers. Her teachers give her no support when classmates ostracize, taunt, and throw things at her. Dinky enjoys thumbing her nose at her peers and embarrasses Gerald, a cute popular boy, by reading a condescending love poem to him in class.

Dinky is befriended by the new school guidance counselor Elizabeth Zaks, who recognizes her intelligence and spirit. Ms. Zaks tries to encourage Dinky to improve her appearance and get along with others more effectively, without compromising her true self. Gerald begins to take an interest in Dinky and tries to get other students to stop harassing her, but Dinky doesn't notice, even though he occasionally spies on her. Dinky becomes convinced that she is the abandoned daughter of Roxy Carmichael, a minor film star who left town for Hollywood 15 years before. Roxy has been invited to return to town to assist in the dedication of a new municipal building, and she has accepted. Dinky becomes fixated on the many similarities she shares with Roxy and questions the town folks for memories of her. The news of her return stirs up old jealousies and insecurities: old schoolmates gossip wildly. Dinky harasses Denton Webb, Roxy's old boyfriend, for information and he lets it slip that Roxy secretly had his baby before she left town, not realizing that Dinky now believes he is her father. Denton becomes so obsessed with Roxy's return that his wife Barbara moves out.

As the date for Roxy's return draws nearer, Dinky becomes more and more desperate to prove that she is Roxy's daughter, visiting the star's childhood home (which is maintained as a cheesy museum), and obsessively questioning Denton about what happened the night she left, believing that Roxy will take her away to a new life. On the day that Roxy is due to arrive, Dinky packs her suitcase and arrives at the welcoming ceremony in a beautiful dress. Rochelle has invited representatives from a boarding school so she can send Dinky away, but Les finally stands up to his spouse and reminds her Dinky is their daughter. A limousine draws up, but a man gets out with a note of explanation: Roxy has not come back. Before the limousine can drive away, Dinky runs after it. Realizing the reason for Dinky's obsession with Roxy, Denton catches up with her and tells her the whole story: although Roxy did have a baby girl, and did leave her with him, the baby died. Roxy is not Dinky's mother, nor is he her father.

Left with nothing, Dinky is rescued by Gerald, who has developed feelings for her. At first, Dinky is suspicious of his interest, but the end of the film shows them together in a relationship where she is really appreciated for who she is, as things return to normal in the town.

Cast

Production notes
The setting of the film, Clyde, Ohio, is a real town. However the film features locations in Sandusky, Ohio as well. Located on the shore of Lake Erie.

Reception
Welcome Home, Roxy Carmichael received mixed reviews. On Rotten Tomatoes, the film has a 50% approval rating based on 10 reviews, with an average rating of 5.2/10. On Metacritic, the film has a score of 44 out of 100 based on 19 reviews, indicating "mixed or average reviews". Audiences polled by CinemaScore gave the film an average grade of "B+" on an A+ to F scale.

One of the most outspoken detractors of the film was Variety, whose comments about it were that "fans of Winona Ryder will definitely want to catch her in an offbeat role as the town rebel in this teen-oriented small-town saga; unfortunately, the rest of the production doesn't quite match up."

Roger Ebert gave the film 2 stars in his original review, and said that "Welcome Home, Roxy Carmichael" contains one small treasure: a perceptive and particular performance by Winona Ryder in the role of a high school outcast", and that "her work is surrounded by a screenplay so flat-footed that much of our time is spent waiting impatiently for foregone conclusions."

Soundtrack
Thomas Newman composed the original score for the film, which was released on cassette and compact disc by Varèse Sarabande. Although Melissa Etheridge wrote and performed two original songs for the film - "Don't Look At Me" and "In Roxy's Eyes (I Will Never Be the Same)" - neither is included on the soundtrack album; while the former has never been released, the latter is included on her 1993 album Yes I Am as "I Will Never Be the Same".

 In the Closet (1:45)
 Little Black Bird (1:23)
 Hers Are Nicest (1:10)
 Refrigerator Shrine (2:36)
 Missing Bossetti Child (:56)
 Wake Up (1:26)
 Clyde (1:44)
 Her Limousine (1:57)
 Several Letters (1:12)
 Choke It (2:18)
 Arriving by Aeroplane (:56)
 Cleveland (1:12)
 Yours Are Nice (:41)
 Baby Soup (2:56)
 In a Beauty Parlor (:35)
 G. on a Bike (1:06)
 Her Majesty's Dress (1:22)
 This Was My Intention (2:29)
 In a Small Town (1:33)

References

External links
 
 
 
 

1990 films
1990s coming-of-age comedy-drama films
1990s satirical films
1990s teen comedy-drama films
American coming-of-age comedy-drama films
American independent films
American satirical films
American teen comedy-drama films
1990s English-language films
Films directed by Jim Abrahams
Films set in Ohio
Paramount Pictures films
Films scored by Thomas Newman
ITC Entertainment films
1990 comedy films
1990 drama films
1990 independent films
1990s American films